Blue Mountain Pottery was a Canadian pottery company located in Collingwood, Ontario. It was founded in 1953 by Dennis Tupy and Jozo Weider (b. 1908 in Zhilina Czechoslovakia) and closed in 2004. Originally producing hand-painted ski motifs on purchased blanks, production of the red clay items started in 1953-1954. It went on to produce various types of pottery, from animal figurines to jugs, pots and vases. The company's products have a large fan base and are collected worldwide.

Blue Mountain Pottery items feature a unique, trademarked glazing process known as "reflowing decorating." Two different liquid glazes, one light and one dark in colour, were applied. During the firing process the glazes would run, creating streaking patterns unique to each piece.

Blue Mountain Pottery items were available in the traditional green hues, but also in harvest gold, cobalt blue, mocha, pewter, red, brown and white.

This pottery is widely collected and has spawned the Blue Mountain Pottery Collectors Club.

External links
 Blue Mountain Pottery Collectors Club
 Blue Mountain Pottery

References

Art pottery
Ceramics manufacturers of Canada
Collingwood, Ontario
Companies based in Ontario
Canadian companies established in 1953
Defunct manufacturing companies of Canada
History of manufacturing in Ontario